Magsingal, officially the Municipality of Magsingal is a 3rd class municipality in the province of Ilocos Sur, Philippines. According to the 2020 census, it has a population of 31,308 people.

Etymology
The name of the municipality came from the term "Mayisingal," an Ilocano term which means "to be moved."  It was applied when the belltower was moved from a previous location to its current site.

Captain Juan de Salcedo had a hand in founding the municipality.  But before he reached the current site of the poblacion, he came to a village called Malongon, about one-half kilometer to the south.  The leader of the village refused Salcedo's request to establish a municipality there, but suggested that he establish the town a half kilometer north of the village, and the belltower be moved to that site, hence the origin of the town's name.

History
Itnegs were the original inhabitants of the place when Salcedo arrived. He worked for the conversion of the people to Christianity, but not all accepted the new faith.  Those who refused conversion fled the town and settled east of Bantay Bul-lagaw (Bul-lagaw Mountain).

Geography

Barangays
Magsingal is politically subdivided into 30 barangays. These barangays are headed by elected officials: Barangay Captain, Barangay Council, whose members are called Barangay Councilors. All are elected every three years.

Climate

Demographics

In the 2020 census, Magsingal had a population of 31,308.

Economy

Government
Magsingal, belonging to the first congressional district of the province of Ilocos Sur, is governed by a mayor designated as its local chief executive and by a municipal council as its legislative body in accordance with the Local Government Code. The mayor, vice mayor, and the councilors are elected directly by the people through an election which is being held every three years.

In 1945, the first duly elected municipal mayor via landslide vote was Hon. Policarpio Cortez Jurado.

Elected officials

Education
 Saint William's Institute - a privately funded educational institution run by the Sisters of Saint Paul of Chartres
 The Magsingal Institute - a private highschool
 Magsingal National High School- a public highschool
 Manzante National Highschool -  a public high school

References

External links

Philippine Standard Geographic Code
Philippine Census Information
Local Governance Performance Management System

Municipalities of Ilocos Sur